Callistege is a genus of moths in the family Erebidae.

Taxonomy
The genus was considered a subgenus of Euclidia by some authors but has been reinstated as a genus.

Species
Callistege diagonalis Dyar, 1898
Callistege fortalitium Tauscher, 1809
Callistege futilis Staudinger, 1897
Callistege intercalaris Grote, 1882
Callistege mi (Clerck, 1759)
Callistege regia Staudinger, 1888
Callistege triangula Barnes & McDunnough, 1918

References

 
Euclidiini
Moth genera